Old National Bank is an American regional bank with nearly 200 retail branches operated by Old National Bancorp and based in Chicago, Illinois and Evansville, Indiana. With assets at $23.0 billion and 162 banking centers, Old National Bancorp is the largest financial services bank holding company headquartered in Indiana and one of the top 100 banking companies in the U.S. Its primary banking footprint is in Illinois, Indiana, Kentucky, Michigan, Minnesota, and Wisconsin.

History

The bank was founded in 1834 as the city's first bank. It has operated under several names, including Evansville National Bank and Old State National Bank. In 1922, it was officially named Old National Bank. The bank holding company Old National Bancorp was formed in 1983 as a multi-bank holding company and now operates in Indiana, Michigan, Wisconsin, Minnesota, Kentucky and Illinois.

In November 1995, Old National acquired the Greencastle-based First United Savings Bank for $18 million in stock. In the following year, Old National acquired the Bloomington-based Workingmens Capital Holdings with its Workingmens Federal Savings Bank subsidiary for an undisclosed amount in stock.

Old National participated in the Treasury Department's Troubled Asset Relief Program (TARP) with the Treasury Department buying $100 million in preferred, non-voting stock. However, by March 2009 Old National had repurchased all of its outstanding stock and had fully exited the TARP program.

In 2009, Charter One's Indiana bank branches became Old National Bank after Old National Bank bought Charter One's Indiana operations. In January 2011, Old National acquired Bloomington-based Monroe Bancorp with its Monroe Bank subsidiary for $90 million in stock. Later that year, Integra Bank was closed by the Federal Deposit Insurance Corporation and all deposit accounts, excluding certain brokered deposits, were transferred to Old National. In 2012, Old National acquired 24 retail bank branches of Bank of America in northern Indiana and southwest Michigan. In 2014, Old National acquired four banks: Tower Bank in Fort Wayne, Indiana, United Bank in Ann Arbor, Michigan, Lafayette Savings Bank in Lafayette, Indiana, and Founders Bank & Trust in Grand Rapids, Michigan.

In January 2016, Anchor BanCorp Wisconsin, the parent company of AnchorBank, the third-largest bank based in Wisconsin, announced that Old National intends to buy Anchor for approximately $461 million. The transaction closed in May of the same year.

In August 2017, Old National agreed to buy Anchor Bank of Minnesota for $303 million.  The acquisition will add 17 locations in the Twin Cities and 1 in Mankato plus $1.7 billion in deposits and $2.1 billion in assets. In June 2018, KleinBank, based out of Chaska, Minnesota, announced its 21 locatons were being acquired by Old National, increasing Old National's presence in the western suburbs of Minneapolis.

In 2021, Old National merged with First Midwest Bancorp, combining the companies assets, retaining the Old National name and maintaining headquarters in Chicago and Evansville.

Services
The company offers retail banking (checking accounts, savings accounts and certificates of deposit, consumer loans including home mortgages, health savings accounts and small business banking & lending), business or commercial banking (checking accounts, savings accounts & CDs, commercial loans and lines of credit, credit cards, capital markets, treasury management, and merchant services), and wealth management, investment, trust and retirement products and services.

In 1995, ONB was ranked number one in earnings momentum by banking journal Financial World. The bank was rated the 28th top performing bank in the nation for 2008 by Bank Director magazine.

References

Further reading
 Bronstein, Barbara F., "In Evansville, All the Top Players are Local," American Banker, March 10, 1995, p. 7. 
 Meschi, Robert L., and Kurt Badenhausen, "The Big Mo: FW Grades America's 100 Largest Banks on Their Earnings Momentum," Financial World, February 21, 1995. 
 Old National Bank 150th Anniversary, 1834-1984: From Evansville's First to Evansville's Largest, Evansville, Ind.: Old National Bank, 1984. 
 Perrone, Ellen, "Old National to Increase Its Out-Of-State Influence," Indianapolis Business Journal, May 22, 1995, p. 9B.
 International Directory of Company Histories, Vol. 15. St. James Press, 1996.

External links

Companies based in Chicago
Companies based in Evansville, Indiana
Banks based in Illinois
Banks based in Indiana
Banks established in 1834
1834 establishments in Indiana